Events from the year 1574 in France

Incumbents
 Monarch – Charles IX (until May 30), then Henry III

Events

 February 23 – The fifth War of Religion against the Huguenots begins in France.

Births

Full date missing
Daniel Dumonstier, artist (died 1646)

Deaths
 
30 May – Charles IX of France (born 1550).
12 June- Renée of France (born 1510)

Full date missing
Gabriel, comte de Montgomery, nobleman (born 1530)
Joseph Boniface de La Môle, nobleman (born c.1526)
Antoine de Créqui Canaples, bishop and cardinal (born 1531)
Antoine de Créqui Canaples, theologian and canonist (born 1494)
Charles, Cardinal of Lorraine, cardinal (born 1524)

See also

References

1570s in France